Ponam is an Austronesian language spoken on Ponam Island, just off Manus Island in Papua New Guinea.

References

Manus languages
Languages of Manus Province